Frankenmuth is a city in Saginaw County in the U.S. state of Michigan. The population was 4,987 at the 2020 census. The city is surrounded by Frankenmuth Township. Bronner's Christmas Wonderland, which bills itself as "the World's Largest Christmas Store", is located in Frankenmuth.

The city's name is a combination of two words. Franken represents the Province of Franconia in the Kingdom of Bavaria from which the original settlers came, and the German word Mut means "courage." Thus, the name Frankenmuth means "courage of the Franconians". The most popular nickname is "Little Bavaria", in reference to the city's German heritage, but the city is also nicknamed "Muth".

History
The area was settled and named by conservative Lutheran immigrants from Roßtal area of Franconia in Germany. The group of settlers left Germany aboard the Caroline on April 20, 1845, and arrived at Castle Garden in New York seven weeks later. They traveled via canals and the Great Lakes from New York to Detroit and arrived in August 1845. Sailing then on the Nelson Smith, the settlers made their way to Saginaw and traveled over land to what is now the city of Frankenmuth.

The purpose of the settlement was primarily religious. The Lutheran group planned to start a mission among the Native Americans. One of the first large buildings was a church. However, their attempts to convert the local groups failed because most of the Native Americans were forced away within a few years.

The settlers selected a hilly area that reminded them of their native Mittelfranken and began building rough shelters there. Frankenmuth was to be an exclusively German Lutheran community. The colonists pledged to remain loyal to Germany, specifically the Kingdom of Bavaria, and to be faithful to the German language. Germans continued arriving until the start of the Second World War.

The community was originally part of Bridgeport Township and later Frankenmuth Township, Frankenmuth became a village in 1904. In 1938, the village hired its first village manager, Herbert L. Keinath. The village was incorporated as a city on October 1, 1959, with Keinath becoming city manager.

The nearby villages of Frankenlust, Frankentrost, and Frankenhilf (now known as Richville) further illustrate that the area remained a magnet for other Germans emigrating from the same region. The German, and in particular, Franconian culture of the town has been preserved and passed down through the generations. The German language is still prevalent in signage and speech, and German speakers continue to reside in the town. In addition, the church of St. Lorenz offers monthly services in the German language.

Geography
The Cass River passes through the town.

Demographics

2010 census

As of the census of 2010, there were 4,944 people, 2,200 households, and 1,313 families residing in the city. The racial makeup of the city was 97.4% White, 0.5% African American, 0.2% Native American, 0.8% Asian, 0.4% from other races, and 0.6% from two or more races. Hispanic or Latino of any race were 1.9% of the population.

There were 2,200 households, of which 23.8% had children under the age of 18 living with them, 50.5% were married couples living together, 7.1% had a female householder with no husband present, 2.0% had a male householder with no wife present, and 40.3% were non-families. 37.2% of all households were made up of individuals, and 22.7% had someone living alone who was 65 years of age or older. The average household size was 2.14 and the average family size was 2.82.

The median age in the city was 50.1 years. 19.3% of residents were under the age of 18; 5.9% were between the ages of 18 and 24; 17.9% were from 25 to 44; 28% were from 45 to 64; and 28.9% were 65 years of age or older. The gender makeup of the city was 44.9% male and 55.1% female.

2000 census

As of the census of 2000, there were 4,838 people, 2,123 households, and 1,322 families residing in the city. The racial makeup of the city was 98.80% White, 0.27% African American, 0.21% Native American, 0.29% Asian, 0.06% from other races, and 0.37% from two or more races. Hispanic or Latino of any race were 0.95% of the population.

Citizens with German ancestry formed nearly 53% of the city population.

24.8% households had children under the age of 18 living with them, 54.8% were married couples living together, 5.8% had a female householder with no husband present, and 37.7% were non-families. 35.7% of all households were made up of individuals, and 20.3% had someone living alone who was 65 years of age or older. The average household size was 2.16 and the average family size was 2.82.

In the city, 20.4% of the population was under the age of 18, 4.7% from 18 to 24, 21.3% from 25 to 44, 25.3% from 45 to 64, and 28.3% was 65 years of age or older. The median age was 48 years. For every 100 females, there were 80.5 males. For every 100 females age 18 and over, there were 75.9 males.

The median income for a household in the city was $51,153, and the median income for a family was $71,667. Males had a median income of $51,004 versus $29,959 for females. The per capita income for the city was $30,479. About 2.4% of families and 4.9% of the population were below the poverty line, including 5.2% of those under age 18 and 7.7% of those age 65 or over.

Economy 
Tourism and farming drive the local economy. Frankenmuth also attracts tourists with festivals and other events throughout the year.

In addition to tourism, a significant number of residents in and around the community work in agriculture.

In late 2022, it was announced that the Bavarian Inn Lodge would break ground on a $80 million, 140,000 square foot expansion of the resort, with the water park becoming the largest indoor park in Michigan and the 4th largest in the world.

Architecture 
The strong influence of Franconian-style architecture can be found in most areas of the city. Most buildings in the commercial district, as well as many homes, feature stylistic interpretations of the timber-framed buildings found in the Franconia region of Germany. This style is marked by the use of timbers in "square" and "X" patterns on the outside of buildings, as well as the use of "X" patterns on windows, doors, and other building features.

Government

The city has a council–manager form of government. The city is served by the Frankenmuth School District.

Festivals
Oktoberfest: In 1990, Frankenmuth, also known as "Michigan's Little Bavaria," celebrated its first Oktoberfest. The Frankenmuth Oktoberfest celebrates German culture, heritage and love. Frankenmuth has a unique German heritage and culture. The Frankenmuth Oktoberfest strives to preserve and share the sights and sounds as well as the food and drink of the Munich Oktoberfest. The goal of the festival is to also retain and celebrate the local Bavarian heritage of the region. Frankenmuth is the first Oktoberfest outside of Munich to be sanctioned by the Parliament and the City of Munich.

When Lord Mayor Christian Ude and the German Parliament from Munich gave the official proclamation in 1996, Frankenmuth's Oktoberfest was declared the first Oktoberfest to operate with the blessing of the original Oktoberfest in Munich. With this proclamation, the event was moved into September to coincide with the opening of the Munich event. Also, for the first time in its history, the world-famous Hofbräuhaus brewery of Munich exported its beer to the United States. Local businessman Fred Schumacher, who later became president of Hofbräuhaus of America, handled the arrangements for getting the beer to Frankenmuth in time for the Oktoberfest. Frankenmuth's Oktoberfest is considered one of the most important and popular autumn festivals in the United States.
Frankenmuth Bavarian Festival: This is Michigan's largest Bavarian heritage festival. Beginning in 1959, it is an annual summer celebration of Bavarian culture and values through food, drink, traditional activities and music.
Frankenmuth SnowFest: Frankenmuth is also host to one of the top snow-sculpting events in North America, Zehnder's SnowFest, which includes the United States Collegiate National Ice Carving Championships.
Frankenmuth Fire Muster: For several years, on the last Saturday in July, the Great Lakes International Antique Fire Apparatus Association (GLIAFAA) holds their annual fire muster, complete with parade, at Heritage Park, displaying restored antique vintage fire trucks, along with several ambulances and police cars, for the public to view and learn a little about the vehicles, their time in active service, and how they came into the ownership of their preservationists, including several of the apparatus showing off their firefighting capabilities along the riverfront.
Frankenmuth Autofest: Held annually on the weekend following Labor Day, Frankenmuth Autofest is a three-day car show that draws over 2,500 classic cars, including muscle cars and street rods. The first day features a block party on Main Street, with the vehicles on display in Heritage Park the following two days. On the display days, a live DJ plays oldies music in the park, primarily focusing on rock and roll music of the 1950s and 1960s.
Michigan's Big Country Fest: An event showcasing country music held the third week of October.
Frankenmuth Dog Bowl and Balloons Over Bavarian Inn: Held on Memorial Day Weekend, this festival is billed as "the world's largest Olympic-style fest for dogs" and features dock and disc dog competitions, sheep herding demonstrations, agility competition, a pet costume contest and parade, a wiener dog race, and other events. In conjunction with Dog Bowl is Balloons Over Bavarian Inn, a competitive event for hot air balloons featuring balloon glow events each night and balloon flights each morning and evening of the festival.

Places of interest

Covered bridge 
Zehnder's Holzbrücke (German for wooden bridge) is a wooden covered bridge, built in a style similar to those of the Black Forest or a river valley in Switzerland, over the Cass River in the middle of town. Though completed in 1979, the structure was constructed using traditional covered-bridge timber framing techniques. The portion receiving the greatest wear is of oak while the remaining portion is spruce.  of Douglas Fir make up the rafters and the roof is shingled with cedar. An additional  of pine was required for the bridge side boards. In addition to two lanes for automobile traffic, the bridge also has two pedestrian walkways.

Heritage Park 
Heritage Park is Frankenmuth's most well-known park. It is located at 601 Weiss Street and is home to many community activities, festivals, and large events. The Harvey E. Kern Community Pavilion is the newest addition and has become a focal point of the park. The park also features four picnic pavilions, three ball diamonds, playgrounds, sand volleyball courts, basketball court, a  riverwalk pathway, and several facilities for festivals.

Silent-Night-Chapel Replica
A scale replica of the Silent-Night-Chapel, where "Silent Night" was originally performed in 1818, is located on the southern end of the property of Bronner's.

Print media

Frankenmuth News
The Frankenmuth News has been Frankenmuth's primary newspaper since 1906. It is released on a weekly basis (Wednesday for news stands and Thursday for residential) and focuses on issues of local concern.

Sister city
 Gunzenhausen, Germany

Notable residents
Eduard Raimund Baierlein (1819-1901), German missionary
Frederick William Danker (1920-2012), lexicographer
Ludwig E. Fuerbringer (1864-1947), Lutheran academic
Kenneth Horn (1959-), Michigan state senator
Greta Van Fleet, rock band

Gallery

See also

 Helen, Georgia
 Leavenworth, Washington
 Solvang, California

References

Further reading
Florer, Warren Washburn. Early Michigan Settlements, Vol. 1: Washtenaw, Westphalia, Frankenmuth, Detroit, 1848. Ann Arbor: Herold Printing Co., 1941.
Johnston, Keith R. "Frankenmuth, Michigan: from German Settlement to Tourist Attraction." Master of Liberal Studies in American Culture diss., University of Michigan—Flint, 1988. 
Pollen, T. J. History of Frankenmuth: with Short Sketches of the Old Settlers.
Zehnder, Herman F. Teach My People the Truth: the Story of Frankenmuth, Michigan. 1970.

External links

 
 City of Frankenmuth
 Frankenmuth Chamber of Commerce and Convention and Visitors Bureau

German-American history
Cities in Saginaw County, Michigan
Populated places established in 1845
German communities in the United States
German-American culture in Michigan
1845 establishments in Michigan